Opció k-95 is a Catalan Oi!/streetpunk band formed in Barcelona in September 1995. Their lyrics include praise for the secession of the Països Catalans (Catalan Countries). They consider themselves redskins, anti-fascists and Catalan patriots. The original line up was Carles (vocals), Daniel (bass) and Raül (drums). Marc (guitar) and Lluís (guitar) joined later.

Discography
Cap Oportunitat (1997)
Mai Morirem  (2000)
Terra Cremada (2004)
Reneix (2010)

External links
  Official site
Interview in Skinhead Revolt

Musical groups from Catalonia
Street punk groups
Oi! groups
Musical groups established in 1995
Culture in Barcelona